Beyul is the sixth full-length studio album by Chicago-based progressive metal band Yakuza. It was released on October 22, 2012, by Profound Lore Records.

Track listing
"Oil and Water" - 4:22
"The Last Day" - 5:50
"Man is Machine" - 8:28
"Fire Temple and Beyond" - 9:55
"Mouth of the Lion" - 2:14
"Species" - 1:25
"Lotus Array" - 6:32

Personnel
 Bruce Lamont - saxophone, vocals
 James Staffel - drums
 Matt McClelland - guitar, vocals
 Ivan Cruz - bass guitar

References

2010 albums
Yakuza (band) albums
Profound Lore Records albums